Drim River may refer to:

 Drim River, the longest river in Albania or either of its two headwaters:
 Black Drim River
 White Drim River